Gammelfarmors chiffonjé ("Great Grandmother's Chiffonier") was the 1979 edition of Sveriges Radio's Christmas Calendar.

Plot
83-years-old widow Maria Beata Josefina lives in a retirement home. She's the great-grandmother to the children Anders, Filippa, Hilda and the baby Beata on their father's side.

References
 

1979 radio programme debuts
1979 radio programme endings
Sveriges Radio's Christmas Calendar